Elias José Silvério de Oliveira (born September 22, 1986) is a Brazilian mixed martial artist currently competing in the Welterweight division of Absolute Championship Akhmat. A professional since 2011, he has formerly competed for the UFC and Jungle Fight. He is the former Jungle Fight Welterweight Champion.

Mixed martial arts career

Early career
Silvério made his professional mixed martial arts debut on September 17, 2011, when he faced Bruno Tavares at Fight Show: MMA 1. He won the fight via unanimous decision. Following this, Silvério would compile an undefeated record of 8–0, also capturing the Jungle Fight Welterweight Championship from Júnior Orgulho at Jungle Fight 52. Silvério would vacate the title in August 2013, when he signed with the Ultimate Fighting Championship.

Ultimate Fighting Championship
In his debut, Silvério replaced an injured Kenny Robertson and he faced João Zeferino at UFC Fight Night: Teixeira vs. Bader on September 4, 2013. He won the fight via unanimous decision.

For his second fight in the promotion, Silvério faced Isaac Vallie-Flagg at UFC Fight Night: Rockhold vs. Philippou on January 15, 2014. He won the fight via unanimous decision.

Silvério then faced Ernest Chavez at The Ultimate Fighter: Brazil 3 Finale on May 31, 2014. He won the fight via rear-naked choke submission, bringing his undefeated record to 11–0.

Silvério faced Rashid Magomedov on December 20, 2014 at UFC Fight Night 58. He lost the fight via TKO in the third round after getting dropped with a stiff left hook and punches, resulting in the first professional loss of his MMA career.

Silvério faced Shane Campbell at UFC Fight Night 74 on August 23, 2015. He lost the fight by unanimous decision and was subsequently released from the promotion.

Absolute Championship Akhmat

Elias made his ACA debut on January 26, 2019 at ACA 91: Agujev vs. Silvério against Arbi Agujev. He won the fight via unanimous decision.

He next faced former Bellator MMA alumni Fernando Gonzalez at ACA 96: Goncharov vs. Johnson. He won the fight via unanimous decision.

Elias faced Aslambek Saidov at ACA 101: Strus vs. Nemchinov on November 15, 2019. He won the fight via unanimous decision.

Elias's fourth fight in the promotion came against Gadzhimurad Khiramagomedov at ACA 113: Kerefov vs. Gadzhiev 2 on November 6, 2020. He lost the fight via unanimous decision.

Silvério faced Former ACA Lightweight champion Ali Bagov at ACA 117: Bagov vs. Silvério on February 12, 2021. He lost the fight via unanimous decision.

Silvério faced Georgiy Kichigin on May 28, 2021 at ACA 123: Koshkin vs. Butenko. He lost the bout via split decision.

Silvério faced Altynbek Mamashov on October 4, 2021 at ACA 130: Dudaev vs. Praia. He lost the bout via TKO in the second round.

Silvério faced Tilek Mashrapov on May 21, 2022 at ACA 139. He lost the bout via split decision.

Championships and accomplishments
Jungle Fight
Jungle Fight Welterweight Championship (One time)
Thunder Fight
Thunder Fight Welterweight Champion (one time)

Mixed martial arts record

|-
|Win
|align=center|18–9–1
|Elder Amorim
|Decision (unanimous)
|Spartacus MMA
|
|align=center|3
|align=center|5:00
|São Paulo, Brazil
|
|-
|Loss
|align=center|17–9–1
|Tilek Mashrapov
|Decision (split)
|ACA 139: Vartanyan vs. Ilunga
|
|align=center|3
|align=center|5:00
|Moscow, Russia
|
|-
|Loss
|align=center|17–8–1
|Altynbek Mamashov
|TKO (punches)
|ACA 130: Dudaev vs. Praia
|
|align=center|2
|align=center|1:52
|Grozny, Russia
|  
|-
|Loss
|align=center|17–7–1
|Georgiy Kichigin
|Decision (split)
|ACA 123: Koshkin vs. Butenko
|
|align=center|3
|align=center|5:00
|Moscow, Russia
|  
|-
|Loss
|align=center|17–6–1
|Ali Bagov
|Decision (unanimous)
|ACA 117: Bagov vs. Silvério
|
|align=center|3
|align=center|5:00
|Sochi, Russia
|  
|-
|Loss
|align=center|17–5–1
|Gadzhimurad Khiramagomedov
|Decision (unanimous)
|ACA 113: Kerefov vs. Gadzhiev 2
|
|align=center|3
|align=center|5:00
|Moscow, Russia
|  
|-
|Win
|align=center|17–4–1
|Aslambek Saidov
|Decision (unanimous)
|ACA 101: Strus vs. Nemchinov
|
|align=center|3
|align=center|5:00
|Warsaw, Poland
|  
|-
|Win
|align=center|16–4–1
|Fernando Gonzalez
|Decision (unanimous)
|ACA 96: Goncharov vs. Johnson
|
|align=center|3
|align=center|5:00
|Lodz, Poland
|  
|-
|Win
|align=center| 15–4–1
|Arbi Agujev
|Decision (unanimous)
|ACA 91: Agujev vs. Silvério
|
|align=center|3
|align=center|5:00
|Grozny, Russia
|
|-
|Loss
|align=center|14–4–1
|Nikolay Aleksakhin
|Decision (unanimous)
|RCC: Russian Cagefighting Championship 3
|
|align=center|3
|align=center|5:00
|Yekaterinburg, Russia
|
|-
|Win
|align=center| 14–3–1
|Saygid Izagakhmaev
|Decision (unanimous)
|Fight Nights Global 87: Khachatryan vs. Queally
|
|align=center|3
|align=center|5:00
|Rostov-on-Don, Russia
|
|-
|Draw
|align=center|13–3–1
|Goyti Dazaev
|Draw (split)
|World Fighting Championship Akhmat 43
|
|align=center|3
|align=center|5:00
|Grozny, Russia
|
|-
|Win
|align=center| 13–3
|Cleber Souza
|Decision (unanimous)
|Hugs Combat 2: Fight Night
|
|align=center|3
|align=center|5:00
|Barueri, Brazil
|
|-
|Loss
|align=center|12–3
|Washington Nunes da Silva
|Submission (rear-naked choke)
|Thunder Fight 8
|
|align=center|2
|align=center|2:15
|São Paulo, Brazil
|Lost the TF Welterweight Championship.
|-
|Win
|align=center| 12–2
|Gilberto Pereira Sousa
|TKO (punches)
|Thunder Fight 6
|
|align=center|1
|align=center|3:35
|São Paulo, Brazil
|Return to Welterweight; won the vacant TF Welterweight Championship.
|-
|Loss
|align=center|11–2
|Shane Campbell
|Decision (unanimous)
|UFC Fight Night: Holloway vs. Oliveira
|
|align=center|3
|align=center|5:00
|Saskatoon, Saskatchewan, Canada
|
|-
|Loss
|align=center| 11–1 
|Rashid Magomedov
|TKO (punches)
|UFC Fight Night: Machida vs. Dollaway
|
|align=center| 3
|align=center| 4:57
|Barueri, Brazil
|
|-
|Win
|align=center| 11–0
|Ernest Chavez
|Submission (rear-naked choke)
|The Ultimate Fighter Brazil 3 Finale: Miocic vs. Maldonado
|
|align=center|3
|align=center|4:21
|São Paulo, Brazil
|
|-
|Win
|align=center| 10–0
|Isaac Vallie-Flagg
|Decision (unanimous)
|UFC Fight Night: Rockhold vs. Philippou
|
|align=center|3
|align=center|5:00
|Duluth, Georgia, United States
|
|-
|Win
|align=center| 9–0
|João Zeferino
|Decision (unanimous)
|UFC Fight Night: Teixeira vs. Bader
|
|align=center|3
|align=center|5:00
|Belo Horizonte, Brazil
|
|-
|Win
|align=center| 8–0
|Júnior Orgulho
|Decision (split)
|Jungle Fight 52
|
|align=center|3
|align=center|5:00
|Belém, Brazil
|
|-
|Win
|align=center|7–0
|Pat DeFranco
|KO (knee and punches)
|Ring of Combat 43
|
|align=center| 1
|align=center| 0:27
|Atlantic City, New Jersey, United States
|Catchweight (160 lbs) bout.
|-
|Win
|align=center|6–0
|Júlio Rafael Rodrigues
|TKO (punches)
|Jungle Fight 46
|
|align=center|1
|align=center|4:13
|São Paulo, Brazil
|
|-
|Win
|align=center|5–0
|Douglas Bertazini
|KO (punches)
|Jungle Fight 43
|
|align=center|1
|align=center|1:21
|São Paulo, Brazil
|
|-
|Win
|align=center| 4–0
|Giovanni Almeida
|TKO (punches)
|Jungle Fight 42
|
|align=center|2
|align=center|3:36
|São Paulo, Brazil
|
|-
|Win
|align=center|3–0
|Gilmar Dutra Lima
|Decision (unanimous)
|Real Fight 8
|
|align=center|3
|align=center|5:00
|São Paulo, Brazil
|
|-
|Win
|align=center|2–0
|Diego Henrique da Silva
|Decision (unanimous)
|Spartans Fighters
|
|align=center|3
|align=center|5:00
|São Paulo, Brazil
|
|-
|Win
|align=center| 1–0
|Bruno Tavares
|Decision (unanimous)
|Fight Show: MMA 1
|
|align=center|3
|align=center|5:00
|São Paulo, Brazil
|
|}

See also
 List of current ACA fighters
 List of male mixed martial artists

References

External links
 
 

1986 births
Living people
Brazilian male mixed martial artists
Lightweight mixed martial artists
Welterweight mixed martial artists
Mixed martial artists utilizing Brazilian jiu-jitsu
Ultimate Fighting Championship male fighters
Brazilian practitioners of Brazilian jiu-jitsu
People awarded a black belt in Brazilian jiu-jitsu
Sportspeople from São Paulo (state)